Vynthala Lake (Malayalam: വൈന്തല തടാകം) is a natural oxbow lake found in Vynthala, near Mala, Thrissur District of Kerala.

Geography 
Lake is also called Oxbow Lake (Thadakam), as it was formed from a "cutoff" of the Chalakudy River which flows nearby. The lake is considered to be the only one naturally formed Oxbow lake in whole of South India.

History
The oxbow lake at Vynthala was identified in 1998 by a team of scientists led by Sunny George. Earlier the lake had a length of 2 kilometres, but now only about 200 meters remain as the rest of the area has been reclaimed. The total area of the lake is around 7 hectares. National Biodiversity Authority (NBA) and Kerala State Biodiversity Board (KSBB) are preparing a report to declare the lake as a Biodiversity Heritage Site (BHS).

References 

Oxbow lakes
Landforms of Kerala
Geography of Thrissur district